Manfred Preußger (born 10 July 1932) is a retired East German athlete. He competed in the men's pole vault at the 1956, 1960 and the 1964 Summer Olympics.

References

External links
 

1932 births
Living people
Athletes (track and field) at the 1956 Summer Olympics
Athletes (track and field) at the 1960 Summer Olympics
Athletes (track and field) at the 1964 Summer Olympics
German male pole vaulters
Olympic athletes of the United Team of Germany
People from Krásná Lípa
Sudeten German people